The 1970 NBA playoffs was the postseason tournament of the National Basketball Association's 1969–70 season. The tournament concluded with the Eastern Division champion New York Knicks defeating the Western Division champion Los Angeles Lakers 4 games to 3 in the NBA Finals. Willis Reed was named NBA Finals MVP.

It was the first NBA title for the Knicks in franchise history, and was their first appearance in the finals since losing their third straight finals in 1953 to the Lakers while they were still in Minneapolis, Minnesota.

For the Lakers, it was their third straight Western Division title and second straight year they lost in Game 7 of the NBA finals. The Lakers dropped their eighth straight NBA finals series (the previous 7 to the Boston Celtics) and were denied their first NBA title since 1954.

It was also the playoff debut of both the second-year Milwaukee Bucks and Phoenix Suns, with the former managing a first-round defeat of the Philadelphia 76ers.

Boston missed the playoffs for the first time since 1951, despite being the defending champions.

Bracket

Division Semifinals

Eastern Division Semifinals

(1) New York Knicks vs. (3) Baltimore Bullets

This was the second playoff meeting between these two teams, with the Knicks winning the first meeting.

(2) Milwaukee Bucks vs. (4) Philadelphia 76ers

This was the first playoff meeting between these two teams.

Western Division Semifinals

(1) Atlanta Hawks vs. (3) Chicago Bulls

This was the second playoff meeting between these two teams, with the Hawks winning the first meeting while based in St. Louis.

(2) Los Angeles Lakers vs. (4) Phoenix Suns

 The Lakers become the second team to come back from a 3–1 series deficit.

This was the first playoff meeting between these two teams.

Division Finals

Eastern Division Finals

(1) New York Knicks vs. (2) Milwaukee Bucks

 Guy Rodgers' final NBA game.

This was the first playoff meeting between these two teams.

Western Division Finals

(1) Atlanta Hawks vs. (2) Los Angeles Lakers

This was the 10th playoff meeting between these two teams, with the Hawks winning five of the first nine meetings.

NBA Finals: (E1) New York Knicks vs. (W2) Los Angeles Lakers

 Jerry West hit a desperation buzzer-beating 60-foot shot to tie it at 102 and force OT.

 Willis Reed surprised the fans by walking onto the court during warmups, prompting widespread applause and inspiring the Knicks to win the title.

This was the third playoff meeting between these two teams, with the Lakers winning the first two meetings while based in Minneapolis.

References

External links 
 Basketball-Reference.com's 1970 NBA Playoffs page

National Basketball Association playoffs
Playoffs

fi:NBA-kausi 1969–1970#Pudotuspelit